The 1974–75 Spartan League season was the 57th in the history of Spartan League. The league consisted of 16 teams.

League table

The division featured 16 teams, 15 from last season and 1 new team:
 Frimley Green, from Surrey Senior League

References

1974–75
9